The symbol ≡ (triple bar) is used in science and mathematics with several different meanings. It may refer to the following:

Mathematics 
 Identity (mathematics), identity of two mathematical expressions
 Logical biconditional, in logic (if and only if)
 Modular arithmetic, a ≡ b (mod m)
 Equivalence relation, often denoted using a triple bar

Chemistry 
 Triple bond, a type of covalent bond between two atoms

Computing
 Hamburger button, often used for drop-down menus
 Symbol for the line feed character in ISO 2047

See also
 ≅, a symbol used in approximation
 The eight trigrams of the Bagua: ☰, ☱, ☲, ☳, ☴, ☵, ☶, ☷
 Ξ, capital letter Xi of the Greek alphabet
 三, Chinese numeral for the number 3
 Glossary of mathematical symbols
 Tesla Model 3, whose logo originally stylized the digit 3 as three horizontal bars
 III (disambiguation), three letter I's in a row